Scoliacma suzannae is a moth in the family Erebidae. It was described by Rob de Vos in 2008. It is found in Papua, Indonesia.

References

Moths described in 2008
Lithosiina